The 2012 European Black Album Tour (also called "The Metallica Vacation Tour 2012") was a concert tour by American heavy metal band Metallica. The Black Album, which was released in August 1991 was played entirely (in reverse order). The band confirmed that the tour would be a celebration of the 20th anniversary of the album. The tour headlined a few European festivals.

Set list

The Black Album

Encore

Tour dates

Personnel
 James Hetfield – vocals, rhythm guitar
 Kirk Hammett – lead guitar
 Robert Trujillo – bass
 Lars Ulrich – drums

Support acts
 Gojira (Prague, Belgrade, Paris, Udine, Oslo, Werchter, Horsens, Warsaw, Helsinki)
 Machine Head (Prague, Belgrade, Udine, Warsaw, Helsinki)
 The Kills (Paris)
 Soundgarden (Werchter)
 Channel Zero (Werchter)
 Mastodon (Oslo, Werchter, Horsens)
 Ghost (Werchter, Helsinki)

References

External links
 Metallica on Tour

Metallica concert tours
2012 concert tours